

362001–362100 

|-bgcolor=#f2f2f2
| colspan=4 align=center | 
|}

362101–362200 

|-id=177
| 362177 Anji ||  || Anji, a county in Huzhou, Zhejiang province, China. || 
|}

362201–362300 

|-id=238
| 362238 Shisseh ||  || Taha Shisseh (born 1990) is a Moroccan geochemist and meteorites specialist at Hassan II University in Casablanca. The discoverer met him for the first time in June 2017 during the International Asteroid Day in Marrakech. || 
|}

362301–362400 

|-id=316
| 362316 Dogora ||  || Étienne Perruchon (1958–2019), a French composer who wrote his first Dogorian songs in an imaginary language in 1996. He also  created a popular work for mixed choir, children's choir and orchestra inspired by his Dogorian songs. The action of this drama had been transposed into Dogora, an imaginary central European country. || 
|}

362401–362500 

|-id=420
| 362420 Rolandgarros ||  || Roland Garros (1888–1918), was a pioneering French aviator and World War I fighter pilot. The French Open tennis tournament takes its name from the Roland-Garros Stadium in which it is held. || 
|}

362501–362600 

|-bgcolor=#f2f2f2
| colspan=4 align=center | 
|}

362601–362700 

|-bgcolor=#f2f2f2
| colspan=4 align=center | 
|}

362701–362800 

|-id=793
| 362793 Suetolson ||  || Suzanne G. M. R. Tolson (1959–2013) was a human resources specialist at National Research Council Canada, both in Ottawa and at the Herzberg Institute of Astrophysics in Victoria. || 
|}

362801–362900 

|-bgcolor=#f2f2f2
| colspan=4 align=center | 
|}

362901–363000 

|-id=911
| 362911 Miguelhurtado ||  || Miguel Hurtado (born 1978), one of the most enthusiastic OAM (Observatorio Astronómico de Mallorca) La Sagra team members. || 
|}

References 

362001-363000